3-(3-hydroxyphenyl)propanoate hydroxylase (mhpA (gene)) is an enzyme with systematic name 3-(3-hydroxyphenyl)propanoate,NADH:oxygen oxidoreductase (2-hydroxylating). This enzyme catalyses the following chemical reaction

 (1) 3-(3-hydroxyphenyl)propanoate + NADH + H+ + O2  3-(2,3-dihydroxyphenyl)propanoate + H2O + NAD+
 (2) (2E)-3-(3-hydroxyphenyl)prop-2-enoate + NADH + H+ + O2  (2E)-3-(2,3-dihydroxyphenyl)prop-2-enoate + H2O + NAD+

3-(3-hydroxyphenyl)propanoate hydroxylase is a flavoprotein (FAD).

References

External links 
 

EC 1.14.13